Yui Kamiji defeated Aniek van Koot in the final, 7–6(9–7), 6–4 to win the women's singles wheelchair tennis title at the 2014 French Open.

Sabine Ellerbrock was the defending champion, but was defeated in the semifinals by van Koot.

Seeds
  Yui Kamiji (champion)
  Sabine Ellerbrock (semifinals)

Draw

Finals

References
 Draw

Wheelchair Women's Singles
French Open, 2014 Women's Singles